The Governor Bento Munhoz da Rocha Netto Hydroelectric Plant, formerly known as Foz do Areia, is dam and hydroelectric power plant on the Iguazu River near Foz do Areia in Paraná, Brazil. It is the furthest dam upstream of the Iguazu Falls and was constructed between 1976 and 1980. The power station has a  capacity and is supplied with water by a concrete face rock-fill embankment dam.

As their main power plant, it is owned and operated by Copel who renamed it after Bento Munhoz da Rocha Netto, governor of Paraná between 1951 and 1955.

History
In May 1973, Copel was awarded the concession contract to construct the dam and by May 1974, various studies had recommended a site near the confluence of the Inguazu and Da Areia Rivers. By August of that year, a design was chosen and in October 1976 after contracts were awarded, construction began. To facilitate the river's diversion, two cofferdams were constructed, one upstream and one downstream of the site. The dam began to impound the reservoir in 1980 and by October it was filled and complete.

At the time of completion, the dam was the tallest and largest concrete face rock-fill dam in the world. It was also the first of its type to have a reservoir of its size. The stability and integrity of such a large dam with a large reservoir helped bring confidence to its specific design.

Dam
Six wheel-type gates facilitate bring water into the power station. An additional gate exists for maintenance purposes.

Power station

See also

List of power stations in Brazil

References

Energy infrastructure completed in 1980
Hydroelectric power stations in Paraná (state)
Dams in Paraná (state)
Dams on the Iguazu River
Concrete-face rock-fill dams
Dams completed in 1980